"Sin Limites" is a four track EP recorded by Belgian/Dutch Eurodance band 2 Unlimited.

Release and reception
Sin Limites was released in 1994 as a collectors item in Chile and The U.S.

The EP did not chart in these territories.

Content
Sin Limites is a collection of four hits from 2 Unlimited, but all choruses are sung by Anita in Spanish.  The rap lyrics by Ray were the same as the English version releases of the singles.

During tours of Spanish speaking countries, Anita would often sing the Spanish versions of the songs. One of the most notable concert performances was the 1996 Vina Del Mar show in Chile.

Track listing

Hits Sin Limites

In 1996, following their successful visit to Chile at the Vina Del Mar awards, an unofficial album containing some of 2 Unlimited's biggest hits was released.  All songs are sung in Spanish by Anita while Ray continues to sing all rap lyrics in English.

The original English version releases are used on the two mega mixes (tracks 12-13).

Track listing
 "Ritmo Tribal" (3:39)
 "Caras" (3:33)
 "A Toda Maquina" (3:43)
 "Deja El Ritmo Controlar Tu Cuerpo" (3:40)
 "La Cosa Real (3:41)
 "Nadie" (3:29)
 "Here I Go" (3:19)
 "Es Como El Llover" (4:42)
 "Hare Lo Bueno Para Mi" (3:55)
 "Saltar De Amor" (3:46)
 "Da Tu Amor" (4:45)
 "MTV Partyzone Megamix" (4:56)
 "2 Unlimited Megamix" (6:04)

References

1993 EPs
2 Unlimited albums